The MVP Model 3 was a prototype American "triphibian" light-sport aircraft, displayed in mockup form in 2014. The aircraft was under development by MVP.Aero Inc. of Delaware. Its developer has since ceased operations.

The company based its design and engineering team in Duluth, Minnesota, with management and administration in Minneapolis. In January 2016, it was announced that the plane would be built in Brunswick, Maine.

Design and development
The MVP Model 3 was designed to operate on land, water, snow and ice. The floor panels were intended to be rearranged to accommodate fishing or camping. The design would be marketed in several versions, including the E-AB, E-LSA, and S-LSA. The aircraft was a two-seater in side-by-side configuration with a pusher propeller and folding wings, which were to be constructed with carbon-fiber composite spars and covered with fabric. The balance of the airframe was constructed from a combination of carbon fiber and fiberglass. Electric thrusters helped the aircraft maneuver in the water.

The design alloeds the canopy to be raised on a four bar system to sit above the engine cowling. This left the cockpit area open for fishing from and can also allow mounting of a tent for camping, with the floor panels inserted. With the canopy fully open the engine was intended to still run for water maneuvering.

The Model 3's lead designer, Mike Van Staagen, is a former Cirrus Aircraft engineer who played a key role in the design and development of the Cirrus Vision SF50 personal jet, as well as the Cirrus SR20 and SR22 composite light aircraft.

Variants
Model 3 E-AB
Model 3 E-LSA
Model 3 S-LSA

Specifications (MVP Model 3)

See also

References

External links

Amphibious aircraft
Single-engined pusher aircraft
High-wing aircraft
2010s United States sport aircraft